Fergus Falls Public Schools (Independent School District No. 544) is a school district headquartered in Fergus Falls, Minnesota. 

In the 20132014 school year the district had 2,486 students. This increased by 6.4% the 20142015 school year the district had 2,697 students. From that school year to the following one, it increased by 2%.

Schools
The sole public secondary school is Kennedy Secondary School, formerly Fergus Falls High School. The district operates four elementary schools: Adams Elementary (grades 1–2), Cleveland Elementary (3–4), McKinley Elementary (K–1), and Prairie Science Class (4–5).

References

External links
 Fergus Falls Public Schools
School districts in Minnesota
Fergus Falls, Minnesota
Education in Otter Tail County, Minnesota